Paul Delaney (born 7 April 1971) is a former professional rugby league footballer who played as a  in the 1980s and 1990s for Leeds and Dewsbury.

Delaney’s son Brad Delaney, and nephew Jim Delaney both play for the Dewsbury in the Kingstone Press Championship.

References

External links
Leeds profile

1971 births
Living people
Dewsbury Rams players
English rugby league players
Leeds Rhinos players
Rugby league halfbacks
Rugby league players from London